ikiwiki is a free and open-source wiki application, designed by Joey Hess. It is licensed under the terms of the GNU General Public License, version 2 or later. ikiwiki is written in Perl, although external plugins can be implemented in any language.

Unlike conventional wiki software, ikiwiki stores its pages in a standard version control system such as Git, Subversion or others.

Features
ikiwiki supports several lightweight markup languages, including Markdown, Creole, reStructuredText and Textile.

In the simplest case, it can function as an off-line static web site generator (possibly still allowing different users to submit changes through VCS; this method is sometimes referred to as wiki compiler), but it can use CGI to function as a normal web-interfaced wiki as well. Login via OpenID is supported.

ikiwiki can be used for maintaining a blog, and includes common blogging functionality such as comments and RSS feeds. The installer includes an option to set up a simple blog at install time.

ikiwiki is included in various Linux distributions, including Debian and Ubuntu.

Use as a (possibly-distributed) bug tracker 

Although wikis and bug tracking systems are conventionally viewed as distinct types of software, Ikiwiki can also be used as a (possibly-distributed) bug tracking system; however, "Ikiwiki has little structured data except for page filenames and tags," so its query functionality is not as advanced or as user-friendly as some other, centralised bug trackers such as Bugzilla.

See also

 Website Meta Language
 Gitit: Another wiki which uses a version control system to store pages

References

External links
 

Free wiki software
Free software programmed in Perl
Software using distributed version control
Distributed bug tracking systems